Whitneyville may refer to a community in the United States:

Whitneyville, Connecticut
Whitneyville, Maine